Zinc finger protein 83 is a protein that in humans is encoded by the ZNF83 gene.

References

Further reading